Raghu Kunche is an Indian music director, playback singer, actor, producer, lyricist, voice actor and television judge who works predominantly in Telugu films and television. He is a recipient of five state Nandi Awards.

Career
Raghu Kunche began his singing career in 2000 with the movie Bachi. He has sung about 1000 above  songs for Telugu Films. Raghu Kunche made his debut as a Music Director for the movie Bumper Offer in 2009. He has won 6 Nandi Awards in his career. He worked as a Dubbing Artist for movies and an anchor for various Telugu TV channels before he became a Playback Singer, Music Director and then an Actor.

Filmography

Music director

Playback singer 
Raghu Kunche sang about 1000 above songs in Telugu films. "Enduke Ravanamma" from Bumper Offer and  "Nakkileesugolusu" from Palasa 1978 shot him to fame.

As an actor

As an anchor 

As a dubbing artiste
Ori Nee Prema Bangaram Kaanu (2003) for Rajesh Krishnan

Awards
He has won five Nandi Awards as an actor, singer, music director, a dubbing artist and an anchor.

Other awards for films:
2009 - Santhosham Best playback singer Award for Nenithe
2010- Ap State Govt Nandi award for Best Music director - Bumper Offer 
 2010 -  Mirchi Music Awards South for Best Upcoming Music Director - BUMPER OFFER
2010 - Big fm - Best upcoming Music director for  Bumper Offer
2010 - Santhosham - best Music Director award for  Bumper Offer
2010 - Cine Goers - Best Music director For  Bumper Offer
2015 - Nominated - IIFA Award for Best Music Director - Telugu - Dongaata
2021 - Nominated - SIIMA Award for Best Male Playback Singer - Telugu - Palasa 1978
2021 - Mirchi Music awards - for Best music Director - Palasa 1978
2021 - Santhosham - Music Director Award for Palasa 1978

References

External links

20th-century births
Living people
Telugu film score composers
Telugu playback singers
Film musicians from Andhra Pradesh
Singers from Andhra Pradesh
Year of birth missing (living people)
Indian voice actors
Telugu male actors
Male actors from Rajahmundry
Male actors in Telugu cinema
Indian male film actors
21st-century Indian male actors
21st-century Indian musicians
20th-century Indian musicians